Nieppe is a commune in the Nord department in northern France. It is in the Lys Plain and a portion of it is in the Lys Valley (Leiedal in Dutch).

Population

Geography

It is situated by the Belgian border. It is located close to Armentières, 42 km southeast of Dunkerque (Dunkirk) and is connected by the A25 (15 km) to Lille. It borders the Belgian municipalities Heuvelland and Comines-Warneton.

Nieppe has a railway station served by TER trains from Calais-Ville station and Dunkerque to Lille-Flandres station. Its nearest airports are in Merville (18 km) and Lesquin (24 km)

Mayors
1790-1802: Jean-Marc Chieus
1802-1837: Constant Watelet de Messange
1837-1841: Pierre Portebois
1841-1848: Charles Vanmerris
1848-1865: Cyrille Delangre-Salembié
1865-1870: Edmond Watelet de Messange
1870-1871: Félix Gokelaere
1871-1875: Hippolyte Delbecque
1875-1890: Louis Loridan
1890-1898: Hippolyte Delbecque
1898-1906: Hector Pollet
1906-1939: Henri Vanuxeem
1939-1968: 
1968-1972: Renée Houcke

History

In its point of its economic view, Nieppe suffered numerous invasions and wars which devastated the area, especially the profit of strategic position of the heart of the agricultural area and more European productives, its strategic axis Lille-Dunkirk via Bailleul and Cassel, the axis, the today's A25.

Heraldry

Points of interests
A local historic museum
Château de Nieppe - features a treasure legend, its part and a centennial tree
War cemeteries of the Commonwealth War Graves Commission:
 Nieppe Communal Cemetery
 Pont-D'Achelles Military Cemetery
 Pont-de-Nieppe Communal Cemetery

People
Line Renaud (born in 1928)
Jules Houcke

Other

Nieppe features its own football (soccer) club FC Nieppe and its handball club (team).  Nieppe also has a library named after Maurice Schumann, its painting and music school and K'Dane (a Nieppe (Nieppoise) dance school).  Miss Cantine was created during the Second World War and was recreated and named on March 31, 2007.  It features several funny faces on the solidarity of several Nieppois residents.  Opened by Jules Houcke, mayor of Nieppe created and alimented a scholar cantine, opened equally for old people of the commune.

See also
Communes of the Nord department

References

External links
Description du département du Nord (Description of the Nord Department) by François-Joseph Grille (d'Angers) Paris, Ed Sazerac & Duval, 1825-1830 (started in 1824) 
 Ville de Nieppe

Communes of Nord (French department)
French Flanders